The 2012–13 Rotor Volgograd season was the 2nd season that the club played in the Russian National Football League.

Squad 

 (captain)

Transfers

Summer

In:

Out:

Winter

In:

Out:

Competitions

Friendlies

Russian National Football League

Results

Table

Russian Cup

RNFL Cup

Table. Groupe «B»

Statistics

Squad Statistics

League

Minutes Played

    
    
    
    
    
    • Player in Application    * Player Dismissed from Field

Goal scorers

Discipline

All Tournaments

Appearances and goals

|-
|colspan="14"|Players who participated only in the RNFL Cup:

|-
|colspan="14"|Players who completed the season with other clubs:

|}

Top Scorers

Disciplinary Record

Team Statistics

Home attendance

Note: bold type font are the highest attendance in round.

General Statistics

References

FC Rotor Volgograd seasons
Rotor